Fakhr al-Islām ʿAbd al-Ḥamīd ibn Rustam ʿAlī al-Madārshāhī (1869–31 March 1920), commonly known as Abdul Hamid Madarshahi or simply Abdul Hamid, was a Bengali Islamic scholar, author and educationist. He was one of the pioneers of introducing the Deobandi movement in Bengal and is noted for being one of the founding fathers of Al-Jamiatul Ahlia Darul Ulum Moinul Islam in Hathazari.

Early life and education 
Sheikh Abdul Hamid was born in 1869 to the Bengali Muslim aristocratic Sheikh family of the village of North Madarsha in Hathazari, Chittagong District, Bengal Presidency, they had also served under the Munshi post, and were a landed clan. His parents were Munshi Sheikh Rustam Ali and Begum Suajan. He traces his lineage to Sheikh Muhammad Hafeez, an Arab Muslim missionary that had arrived at the Port of Chittagong centuries prior, initially settling in the Jahanabad mahalla of Sitakunda where he established himself as a local zamindar (landowner). As the result of a local epidemic, Hafeez's descendant Sheikh Murad migrated to the village of Baroauliya, and Murad's descendant Sheikh Shamsher Ali Taluqdar settled in his maternal home in Madarsha, Hathazari.

Madarshahi's early education began at his home and later at the local maktab, where he gained religious education and learnt the Qur'an. He then joined the local primary school until class five, later enrolling at the Mohsinia Madrasa in Chittagong city. It is said that he topped the class exams every year at the Mohsinia Madrasa. He completed books such as the Mishkat al-Masabih in this madrasa.

Career

During his time at the Mohsinia Madrasa, Madarshahi was familiarised with Abdul Wahid Bengali and became greatly influenced by him, eventually co-operating in his reformation movement. He participated in various religious seminars and debate conferences, and started to become known as a debater. Thereafter, he was bestowed the title of Fakhr al-Islām (Glory of Islam) and Munāẓir-e-Islām (Debater of Islam). From very early on, he founded a small maktab in Khandaqia where he provided religious education to children, as well as the elderly. Madarshahi also played an important role in establishing maktabs in other areas.

In 1896, he co-founded Al-Jamiatul Ahlia Darul Ulum Moinul Islam along with Abdul Wahid Bengali, Sufi Azizur Rahman and Habibullah Qurayshi, after realising the importance of having a madrasa in colonial Bengal. The madrasa was founded along with the assistance of locals too. Madarshahi also established another large madrasa in nearby Fatehpur, known as al-Jāmiʿah al-Ḥamīdiyyah Nāṣir al-Islām.

Works 
Madarshahi has written several works pertaining to Islam. These include:
Tuḥfah al-Mu'minīn (A Gift to the Believers)
Masā'il-i-Ramaḍān (Issues pertaining to Ramadan)
Faḍā'il-i-ʿĪdgāh (Virtues of the Eidgah)
Faḍā'il-i-Iʿtikāf (Virtues of the Iʿtikāf)

Death and legacy 
Madarshahi died on 31 March 1920. He had two sons; Allama Muhammad Ismail and Mufti Muhammad Yusuf.

See also 
 Mawlana Murad

References 

20th-century Muslim scholars of Islam
Sunni Muslim scholars of Islam
1869 births
1920 deaths
Deobandis
People from Hathazari Upazila
19th-century Bengalis
20th-century Bengalis
Bengali Muslim scholars of Islam
Bangladeshi people of Arab descent
Founding members of Darul Ulum Hathazari